Senator Donahue may refer to:

Laura Kent Donahue (born 1949), Illinois State Senate
Maurice A. Donahue (1918–1999), Massachusetts State Senate
Sue Donahue (fl. 2010s), Arizona State Senate